Cameron Coca-Cola Bottling Co. was a large Coca-Cola Bottling company in Washington, Pennsylvania.

The company was founded in 1889 as Cameron Flavorings.  In the early 1900s, the company began a relationship with Coca-Cola.  The company had plants in Washington, Pennsylvania, Houston, Pennsylvania, Wheeling, West Virginia, and Canton, Ohio.

In 1996, the company's facilities were converted to natural gas with a $124,000 grant by the Pennsylvania Department of Environmental Protection.

The company operated by purchasing the syrup from Coca-Cola, mixing it, and distributing it to the surrounding areas.  By the late 1990s, Cameron Coca-Cola was 10th largest Coke bottler and the second longest family-run Coke bottler in the nation.

The company had a number of deals with local school districts where they paid thousands of dollars for exclusive rights to sell Coke on school premises.  The deal with Hampton Township School District paid the district $40,000 ove seven years.  The deal with Upper St. Clair School District paid the district $50,000 over five years.  In the deal with Quaker Valley School District, Cameron agreed to buy several new scoreboards in exchange for the right to have their logo on the scoreboard and for exclusive rights to sell Coke on school premises.  There was another exclusive deal with Woodland Hills School District.

Cameron Coca-Cola sponsored championship harness racing at The Meadows Racetrack and Casino.  The company was also a namesake sponsor of the Pittsburgh-Allegheny County Fair.

Family and philanthropy
The patriarch of the Cameron Family, Wilfred Cameron, died in 1999.

The Cameron family have been closely connected to Washington & Jefferson College in Washington, Pennsylvania for several decade.  A number of Camerons attended the college, with three individuals serving on the Board of Trustees.  Winnie Cameron, who served on the board of trustees, has been awarded the Alumni Distinguished Service Award and an honorary degree.

In 1999, the family donated $2.65 million, one of the top 5 donations in the college history, to redesign and expand College Field, which was renamed Cameron Stadium.  They also funded the digital scoreboard at Henry Memorial Center and Ross Memorial Park and Alexandre Stadium.  In 2006, the family was awarded the Robert M. Murphy Award and inducted into the W&J Athletic Hall of Fame.

Sale to Coca-Cola Enterprises in 1998
In 1998, Cameron Coca-Cola Bottling was purchased by Coca-Cola Enterprises, the largest Coke bottling company in the world.  The deal, which coincided with the purchase of five other Coke bottlers, was part of a play by Coca-Cola Enterprises to consolidate Coke's distribution chain amid the Cola Wars against Pepsi.  All told, the six deals cost Coca-Cola Enterprises $770 million in stock, cash, debt, and assumed debt.

Later operations
In 2008, following the sale, the Cameron operation moved to Kalama – in Washington state but on the Columbia River near Portland, Oregon – and was re-christened the Cameron Family Glass Packaging LLC, with the goal of producing wine bottles for the wine industry in the Western United States. There, the company built a wine bottling plant. The  facility, which cost $109M to build, became the first new glass plant built in the nation in over 30 years to exclusively produce wine bottles. It became the largest such plant to be operated on an "eco-friendly" basis, with an electric furnace using hydroelectricity generated by the Columbia River. The plant provided wine bottles for a number of Washington wines, but had to file for Chapter 7 bankruptcy in 2009 due to a furnace failure that caused $12M in damages within a month of startup. Production was later resumed under new ownership following a court-ordered sale in 2010.

References

Coca-Cola bottlers
Companies based in Washington County, Pennsylvania
Defunct companies based in Pennsylvania
Food and drink companies disestablished in 1998
1889 establishments in Pennsylvania
Food and drink companies established in 1889
1998 disestablishments in Pennsylvania
Drink companies of the United States